Statistics of American Soccer League II in season 1936–37.

Metropolitan Division

Playoffs

First round
 Kearny Scots defeated Baltimore 3–1
 Paterson defeated Philadelphia Passon, 6–2

Semifinals
 Brooklyn Hispano defeated Brooklyn St. Mary's, 4–3, 3–2
 Kearny Scots defeated Paterson 3–2

Championship finals
 Kearny Scots defeated Brooklyn Hispano 5–3, 3–3. Aggregate: 8–6

New England Division

First half

Second half

References

American Soccer League (1933–1983) seasons
American Soccer League, 1936-37